GoodReader is an iOS application used to primarily edit PDF documents. It was originally developed in Moscow by Good.iWare Ltd., a company started by Yuri Selukoff, a Russian developer.  Yuri has subsequently relocated to the United States and started Good.iWare, Inc. in San Francisco, California.

Features
GoodReader supports opening and viewing numerous file types, including most document and video file formats, including HTML, audiobooks, and pictures. PDF files can be annotated and manipulated by the user. Syncing with various cloud storage services including Box, Dropbox, Google Drive and iCloud Drive is also supported. GoodReader can also read PDF documents aloud using text-to-speech.

History
GoodReader was first released by Good.iWare in 2009.

In 2014, GoodReader 4 was released as a major update. Unlike previous updates, GoodReader 4 was released as a new application, meaning that users would have to re-purchase the app from the App Store if they previously owned the product. The update added multiple features including the ability to manipulate PDF files, manage document pages, and view page previews. GoodReader 4 supports migrating data from previously installed versions of the app.

On January 28, 2019, GoodReader 5 was released as a major update. This update included an overhauled UI, support for the Apple Pencil 2, AES-256 encryption, and other general security features. This latest version also allows iPad users to view documents side-by-side in split-screen.

References

External links
 Official website

IOS software
PDF readers
PDF software
Media readers
Media players
2009 software